Chah Mosallam (also Romanized as  Chāh Mosallam; also known as Chah-e Moslem and Chāh-i-Musallam) is a village in Moghuyeh Rural District, in the Central District of Bandar Lengeh County, Hormozgan Province, Iran. At the 2006 census, its population was 1,947, in 316 families.

References 

Populated places in Bandar Lengeh County